Highway 77 (AR 77, Ark. 77, and Hwy. 77) is a north–south state highway in Northeast Arkansas. The route of  runs from US Highway 70 (US 70) in West Memphis north through small towns and agricultural areas of the Arkansas Delta to the Missouri state line. It is generally a low-traffic road except in West Memphis. Created during the 1926 Arkansas state highway numbering, the route was extended in the 1950s and 1960s, including along a former alignment of US 61. AR 77 does not have any spur or business routes.

Between West Memphis and Turrell, the highway is part of the Great River Road National Scenic Byway. The route is maintained by the Arkansas Department of Transportation (ArDOT).

Route description
ArDOT maintains AR 77 as part of the state highway system. ArDOT estimates the traffic level for a segment of roadway was highest just south of the I-40 junction in West Memphis, estimated at 21,000 vehicles per day in 2021, on average. It dropped to 15,000 VPD north of the interstate and continues to drop north, to 8,800 VPD, 1,400 VPD at James Mill, to 820 at Turrell. In Mississippi County, traffic was below 400 VPD south of Athelstan, and ranges between 440-1800 north of it (excluding concurrencies). For reference, roads under 400 VPD are classified as "very low volume local road" by the American Association of State Highway and Transportation Officials (AASHTO).

A small segment of AR 77 in West Memphis is part of the National Highway System (NHS), a network of roads important to the nation's economy, defense, and mobility.

AR 77 begins at US 70 (Broadway/Great River Road) in West Memphis, a suburb within the Memphis metropolitan area. The route runs north as Missouri Street and the Great River Road, beginning near the Wilson Power and Light Company Ice Plant and one block north of the former West Memphis City Hall. Continuing through a commercial area, AR 77 crosses Ten Mile Bayou and passes West Memphis Christian School before an intersection with I-40/I-55/US 61/US 64/US 79. The highway passes underneath the freeway, briefly jogging along a service road and crossing the BNSF Railway before continuing northbound. Now in an industrial area known as Pressley Junction, AR 77 serves as the northern terminus of AR 191 (7th Street) before crossing the Union Pacific Railway tracks and entering Marion. AR 77/GRR wind through the city to downtown Marion, where it intersects US 64 (Military Road) near Marion City Hall. Continuing northbound, AR 77/GRR passes the historic Marion Colored High School in the small town of Sunset.

The highway continues north, paralleling the BNSF railway into a rural area, passing through the small communities of James Mill, Jericho, and Clarkedale, serving as the eastern terminus of AR 50 (Clarkedale Road) in the latter. Continuing north, AR 77/GRR passes along the west side of the Wapanocca National Wildlife Refuge (NWR), crossing Big Creek, entering the city of Turrell, and intersecting AR 42, which serves as the entrance to the NWR. The routes run along the west side of Turrell, passing the former Turrell High School before entering a large interchange. AR 77 first intersects US 61, with the Great River Road turning onto US 61 north, as well as an on-ramp to I-55 southbound. AR 77/US 61 continue north to an on-ramp to I-55/US 61 northbound; now alone, AR 77 becomes an on-ramp for the beginning of I-555. The two routes run together as a freeway to exit 2, where AR 77 exits I-555 east into Gilmore. The route then turns south and runs as a frontage road along I-555, curving along I-55 and eventually becoming a section line road facing due north toward Mississippi County.

AR 77 passes through a rural area of the Arkansas Delta, briefly overlapping AR 308 near Birdsong and crossing AR 118 and the Tyronza River. It passes near the Johnny Cash Boyhood Home before a junction with AR 14. Continuing north, AR 77 serves as the eastern of both AR 198 near Bondsville and AR 297 near West Ridge. The route turns right at AR 140 in Etowah, forming a concurrency eastbound to Athelstan, where AR 77 turns left, breaking the concurrency. Continuing northbound, AR 77 serves as the eastern terminus of AR 136 at Carroll's Corner, briefly overlaps AR 158 at Floodway, passes through the unincorporated community of Shady Grove, and forms a short overlap with AR 18 in the small town of Manila. AR 77 continues north to a junction with AR 119 at Poplar Corner. The two routes form a wrong-way concurrency westbound to Leachville, where the concurrency ends at Main Street, with AR 77 turning north and continuing to the Missouri state line, where the road continues as Route 108.

History

Highway 77 was created in the 1926 Arkansas state highway numbering as one of the original state highways between State Road 40 between Etowah and West Ridge and Missouri. The southern terminus was switched from West Ridge to Athelstan on the 1952 state highway map.

A year later, a second segment of AR 77 was created between US 61 north of Turrell and Denwood. On July 29, 1953, the Arkansas State Highway Commission extended the route along AR 14 and south to an area near Whitton. The route was extended along a former alignment of US 61 between Turrell and West Memphis on August 22, 1956. In the 1960s, AR 77 was rerouted around downtown Manila, with the former alignment becoming AR 18 Business (AR 18B). On April 24, 1968, AR 77 was realigned onto a county road and replaced part of AR 136 through Bondsville at the request of the Mississippi county judge.

A minor realignment took place at Manila following construction of a new AR 18 bypass in 2014.

Major intersections
Mile markers reset at concurrencies.

See also

 List of state highways in Arkansas

Notes

References

External links

077
Transportation in Crittenden County, Arkansas
Transportation in Mississippi County, Arkansas
077
U.S. Route 61